Jesper Isaksen (born 13 October 1999) is a Norwegian professional footballer who plays for Kristiansund as a midfielder.

Career statistics

References

1999 births
Living people
Norwegian footballers
Kristiansund BK players
Eliteserien players
Association football midfielders
Stabæk Fotball players
FK Jerv players
Sportspeople from Bærum
Fredrikstad FK players